Jack Scully is a fictional character from the Australian soap opera Neighbours, played by Jay Bunyan. He made his first on-screen appearance on 17 April 2001. The character was initially played by Paul Pantano in a guest role. When he returned in 2002, Bunyan had taken over the role. Jack is the first son of Joe and Lyn Scully. He departed on 8 December 2004, with a further appearance on 11 January 2005.

Casting
Following the introduction of the Scully family in 1999, Jack was often mentioned by his parents and siblings. In 2001, Paul Pantano was cast in the role of Jack and introduced to the show. Pantano and Jack left that same year. When the character was reintroduced in 2002, Jay Bunyan took over the role. Bunyan was auditioned for the role in New Zealand by Jan Russ. He and Michelle Ang (Lori Lee) impressed Russ and their roles were especially written into the storylines. Bunyan was nineteen when he joined the cast. He relocated to Melbourne for filming and signed a two-year contract.

In December 2003, Linda Barnie of the Newcastle Herald reported Bunyan was considering leaving Neighbours. The actor decided to depart from the show in late 2004. He told James Elliott of the BBC that the producers had wanted him to sign a contract for another few years to keep the Scully family alive on the show. However, he admitted that he wanted to finish as he had had enough. During an interview published in Inside Soap, Bunyan revealed that he had only ever intended to stay with the soap for two years.

Development

Introduction and characterisation

Jack is the eldest son of Joe (Shane Connor) and Lyn Scully (Janet Andrewartha). He is the brother of Stephanie (Carla Bonner), Felicity (Holly Valance), Michelle (Kate Keltie) and Oscar (Ingo Dammer-Smith). Before his introduction, Jack was said to be a champion footballer playing for Barnsford FC in England. When Jack's family learn he has disappeared and no one can track him down, they become concerned. Bonner told Inside Soap "Joe and Lyn are really worried, especially because they are so far away and there seems to be nothing they can do about it." Jack eventually turned up in Ramsay Street and shocked his family by announcing his decision to quit football. Joe gets Jack a job on his building site, but Jack decided playing football was not so bad and he returned to England. The character returned to Neighbours in 2002, now played by Bunyan. Jack's girlfriend, Lori Lee (Ang), was introduced a week later and it was revealed that Jack had been dropped by Barnsford and he had spent his time in New Zealand with Lori and her family. Andrew Mercado, author of Super Aussie Soaps, said Jack was not pleased Lori had followed him to Erinsborough. Bunyan described Jack as "a bit of an idiot" and said he was quite different from his character.

Relationship with Nina Tucker

During a trip away to the beach, Jack realised he was attracted to Nina Tucker (Delta Goodrem) and he thought about replacing Lori with her. Jack and Nina are cast in Harold Bishop's (Ian Smith) play Mission Erinsborough, and they began an affair. Peter Mattessi of The Age said Jack and Nina's love "bubbled until it almost erupted." Nina broke up with her boyfriend Taj Coppin (Jaime Robbie Reyne) to be with Jack, but when Jack tried to do the same with Lori, he learnt she had been paralysed from the waist down due to a fall. Jack became torn over whether to leave Lori and be with Nina and he confided in his younger sister, Michelle. Mattessi said bringing in another character to the story meant "more tension, which delivered a bigger climax" and provided weeks of fallout. Both Lori and Taj find out about Nina and Jack, and Nina decides to remain single. However, she and Jack eventually decide to begin their relationship again.

When Nina told Jack she was not ready to have sex with him, he cheated on her with Edwina Valdez (Lucia Smyrk). Nina later broke up with him and Jack became depressed. Jack encountered Izzy Hoyland (Natalie Bassingthwaighte), who had just been rejected by a younger guy, in the pub and she invited him back to her hotel room. Bunyan told Inside Soap that Izzy is the one person who makes Jack feel better and she is totally supportive of him, Jack thinks she understands him. Jack goes back to Izzy's hotel room and they have sex. Of this, Bunyan said "Izzy is quite upfront about it - she doesn't want a relationship. She just wants a bit of fun, which suits Jack perfectly. He's actually quite broken hearted over Nina, and Izzy helps him feel good about himself." Jack witnessed Nina kissing Connor O'Neill (Patrick Harvey) and he got really angry with Connor, who was his best friend. He threatened Connor and became jealous of his friendship with Nina. Jack was also having problems with Izzy and their relationship. Bunyan explained Izzy was calling the shots and taking Jack for a ride, which was quite a role reversal. Bunyan added "It's a totally different relationship to Jack and Nina, which makes it new and interesting to play."

Goodrem departed Neighbours in 2003 after she was diagnosed with Hodgkin's lymphoma. Her character became confused about her love life and struggled with her feelings for Jack. She decided to leave Erinsborough to go visit her father in India. Goodrem returned to Neighbours in September 2004 to tie up Nina's storylines. Goodrem told Jackie Brygel of TV Week that Nina returned to Erinsborough because she was missing Jack, the love of her life. Nina's return was bad timing for Jack, who had recently been involved in a near-fatal car accident due to his drug taking. Bunyan told Brygel "It's a little too much for Jack to bear at this point. He thinks Nina has come back and she's this amazing movie star. She looks fantastic and I'm this drop kick who has just had a major car accident, ruined me parents' business and is trying to get off the drugs!" Jack was overwhelmed and excited to see Nina, and the couple eventually fell back into each other's arms. Nina left to go to America and Jack eventually joined her in 2005.

Partying and drug addiction
In June 2004, Jack became the centre of a storyline which saw him partying and taking drugs. When Jack found himself being mocked by his co-workers on the building site, he became frustrated and started partying in nightclubs to forget his problems. Jack met Olivia McPherson (Silvia de Crespigny) in a nightclub and realised she liked partying as much as he did. Bunyan told TV Week "This is the first time Jack's met a girl who is into what he's into. He latches onto her and, once again, he thinks he's found the love of his life." Jack and Olivia formed a bond and they both revealed their reason for partying was work troubles. Jack and Olivia go out partying at night and Jack returns home in the early hours. Jack's mother, Lyn, challenged Jack to just be friends with Olivia as she became sick of him thinking he was in love with every girl that paid attention to him. Jack's partying began to affect his work and he suffered a nasty fall one day, after he went straight from a club to the building site. Bunyan explained "Jack's very tired and weary-eyed and he gets up a ladder without a harness, and goes to do a roof job and has a terrible slip." Lyn and Karl Kennedy (Alan Fletcher) questioned Jack about how much time he was spending in clubs, but he refused to answer them.

Olivia introduced Jack to drugs and he began taking them while out partying. Bunyan revealed that when he got the storyline saying Jack was going to become a drug addict, he decided to get away from the "pretty boy image" and grew his hair long. He added "The make-up artists would try and touch up my face and I'd say, 'no, I'm supposed to be on drugs!' So I'd go on set with no make-up and would rub my eyes and look like a scruff." To raise money for their new lifestyle, Jack and Olivia stole some tools from the building site to sell. Olivia persuaded Jack to frame Darren Stark (Todd MacDonald) for the theft. Bunyan said Jack would have taken the blame for the theft himself if Olivia had not been pressuring him. The following week, Jack found himself waking up in the gutter following yet another night out. He had no recollection of what happened and he was found and taken home by Max Hoyland (Stephen Lovatt) and Lou Carpenter (Tom Oliver). Max became worried about Jack and told Steph about finding him. Steph then confronted Jack about his partying and her suspicion that he was taking drugs.

Storylines
Jack first arrives in Ramsay Street, much to the surprise and relief of his parents who had been notified by his coach in London that he has gone AWOL. Jack is on hand to support his sister Stephanie when her boyfriend Larry "Woody" Woodhouse (Andrew Curry) is forced to go into witness protection. When Jack tells his parents that he wants to give up the soccer and return to Australia permanently and follow his father Joe into the building trade, Joe devises a plan to make Jack change his mind. After realising he is not ideal for his father's line of work, Jack returns to London.

The following year Jack returns, followed by his girlfriend Lori Lee and they settle into the Scully house. Not long after their arrival, Jack becomes attracted to Michelle's friend Nina Tucker when he and several other teens go on schoolies. Jack unwittingly lands the lead in Harold Bishop's play Mission Erinsborough, which is directed by Lori and is cast opposite Nina, who is dating Taj Coppin. Jack and Nina begin meeting in secret and though both feel guilty, they can not resist the temptation. The truth is revealed after Nina dumps Taj and there is ill feeling for a while between the boys. A while later, Nina reveals to Jack she is still a virgin and wants him to be her first. However, Edwina Valdez arrives on the scene and seduces Jack. Taj unwittingly informs Nina – who he assumed already knew. Nina then ends things with Jack.

Jack and Taj later contemplating cheating on their VCE by using stolen exam papers a friend of Taj's managed to obtain. The boys use the paper and get an attack of conscience when a story is leaked about stolen exam papers and panic that Taj's friend will turn them in. In the end, the boys own up. After leaving school, Jack has a second try at labouring on the site with Joe. After being generally ribbed and mocked, Jack manages to persevere.

When Lori returns with her and Connor O'Neill's daughter, Madeleine (Madison Lu), Jack decides to stand by her. Lyn, Jack's mother warns Lori of her son's nature and arranges for her to take a job at a salon in Lorne. Jack later meets Olivia McPherson (Silvia de Crespigny) while out clubbing and she introduces him to drugs. As Jack's party lifestyle starts to take over, he begins making mistakes on the site and he and Olivia steal tools to make some money. Olivia suggests framing Darren Stark, who is working as an electrician, for the site robbery as Darren has prior convictions. This backfires as Jack's drugged-out behaviour comes to a head when he crashes his car into a power pylon, knocking out all the power in the local area. He is then charged with driving under the influence. Jack finds out that Olivia is a crooked police officer and she is later exposed by colleague Stuart Parker (Blair McDonough).

Charlie Cassidy (Cliff Ellen), Jack's grandfather arrives to spend what is to be his last Christmas with the family, and advises Jack to join Nina in America, even paying for the ticket. Jack checks into a hotel in Los Angeles to find Nina preparing the room and the two reunite. It has since been mentioned by Lyn that Jack and Nina are engaged, but have had no mention of a wedding.

Reception
For his portrayal of Jack, Bunyan was nominated for "Most Popular New Male Talent" at the 2003 Logie Awards. The BBC said Jack's most notable moments were "Playing football for Barnsford in England" and "Cheating on Lori with Nina." Linda Barnier of the Newcastle Herald said Jack was a womaniser who could not keep out of trouble. The character was popular in terms of his appearance. Nick Levine of media and entertainment website Digital Spy claimed in a section aimed specifically at gay readers, that "Neighbours' Jack Scully (Jay Bunyan) was in pretty good shape, wasn't he? Must have been all that soccer training...".

References

External links
 Character profile at the BBC

Neighbours characters
Fictional association football players
Fictional construction workers
Television characters introduced in 2001
Male characters in television